Birote Khurd is a subdivision of Berote Kalan Union Council in Pakistan.

History 
As part of the local government reforms of 2000, Berote Khurd lost the status of Union Council and was merged into Berote Kalan.

Etymology
The name of the union council "Birote or Berote Khurd" means lesser Birote, differentiating it from the larger settlement of "Birote Kalan". The words Khurd and Kalan (little and big) are administrative terminology dating back to Mughal times – to differentiate two areas with the same name, hence Birote Khurd means little birote (cf. Britannia major, "Greater Britain" and Britannia minor "Lesser Britain").

Geography 
Berote Khurd is located in the east part of Abbottabad District in the North West Frontier Province. To the east is the Birote Kallan and Kashmir region and in the west Nathiagalli areas, to the south is Pluck and to the north is the Bakot area. Birote Khurd lies in the foothills of famous Mushkpuri peaks of the Galyat Region.

Demographics 

It has a population of 2,500. The main tribes of Berote Khurd are the Thadyabal, Mojwal, Nakodraal, Lahral (a sub tribe of the Dhond Abbasi). Others tribes are Awans, Gujjars, Seyeds, Pathans, and Qureshis.

Main settlements 

The main wards of Berote, Khurd are (with notable residents):

Nakkar Kutbal - Imtiaz Hussain Abbasi, MD., Shahzad Abbasi, Zeeshan Arshad S/O Arshad Hussain 
 Lahoor - Rustam Abbasi
 Mohra - Qazi Muhammad Sajawal, Fazal Rahim Abbasi, Naib Nazim Sarwar Abbasi, Nawaz Abbasi (late), and Zafeer Abbasi
 Nakar Mojwal - Muhammad Almas Abbasi, Yasir Abbasi, Shakir Abbasi, Sardar Hanif Abbasi, Siddique Abbasi, Zaheer Abbasi, Abiq Abbasi, Haji Khadim Abbasi, Wajid Abbasi, Ismdad Abbasi, Ziyab Abbasi, Arshad Abbasi, Allah Ditta Abbasi
 Rialiy - Farooq Abbasi, Waqas Qudoos Abbasi
 Batala
 Hotrari/Hotrary - Haji Muhammad Khushid Abbasi, Haji Muhammad Iqbal Abbasi, Hafiz Munib Abbasi, Amir Abbasi, Zakeer Abbasi, Asim Iqbal, Muhammad Bilal Baseer Abbasi
 Mawan Di Hill Mumtaz Abbasi (late), Shafeeq Abbasi 
 Soi Nakheter - Waheed Anwar Abbasi, Nadeem Zareen Abbasi
 Moori - Zafeer Brothers
 Poora - Mushtaq Abbasi
 Sangrerhi - Haneef Abbasi, Khurshid Hotrari, Sauod Mahmood
 Toopa- Haqeeq Abbasi
 Nari Hoter - Iftekhar Abbasi, Sadaqat Abbasi
 Hotrol - Mohsin Imdad, Sajjad Abbasi, Shahbaz Abbasi 
 Bhan - Rahimdad Abbasi, Tikka Khan Abbasi 
 Khrindi - Shabbir Abbasi, Nawaz Abbasi
 Kali Kandal - Suleman Hussain, Sharif Khan

Transport

The Qazi Sajawal road from Basian/Abbasian Hotrari Chowk to BHU Mohra road (7-KM) connects Swargali- Boi highway (a junction on the main Abbottabad-Murree Road), and the Hadhrat Molana Pir Fakir-u-llah Bakoti Road from Bakot provide transportation links to Birote Khurd. Peer Azhar Bakoti road connects Hotrati Chowk to Bakote Via Hotrari, Hotrol, Bhan. Mumtaz Abbasi connects Hotrari to Moori via Mawan Di Hill.

A lift from Hotrari Chowk to Hotrari opened in 2004 stretching . Another cable car  connects Birote Klan to Nakker Qutbal and then Nakker Qutbal to Mohra (Lammi joo). This cable car crosses Knair and Kasss streams.

History 

This area was a market for Birote Khurd people in winter in the 20th century, but this tradition died out. Water mills vanished during the 1970s, from Gandran ni Dheri, lower Naker Qutbal.

References 

http://thefrontierpost.com/mohra-road-needs-immediate-repair-works/

Populated places in Abbottabad District